Sada Cruzeiro Vôlei is a Brazilian professional volleyball team based in Contagem, Minas Gerais, Brazil. They compete in the Brazilian Superliga and were the champions in the 2011–12, 2013–14 and 2014–15 seasons. In 2012, 2014 and 2016 won the South American Championship.

History
Founded in 2006 in Betim, part of the Belo Horizonte metropolitan area in the state of Minas Gerais, Sada merged with Cruzeiro in 2009 and is now based in neighbouring Contagem.
The volleyball team was founded in 2006 as "Sada Betim" and had the Grupo Sada as the main sponsor. Throughout the years, Sada, the company based in Betim, Minas Gerais, has become responsible for managing the "Club", and in 2008 the "Associação Social e Esportiva Sada" was created.

In 2009 the partnership with Cruzeiro Esporte Clube, a traditional Brazilian football club was formalized, and the team gained one of the largest volleyball fan-bases in the country driven by Cruzeiro's about eight million supporters.

Sada Cruzeiro is the only Brazilian volleyball club to ever win the FIVB Volleyball Men's Club World Championship.

Team
Squad as of October 2019

Honours

FIVB Club World Championship
  (x4) 2013, 2015, 2016, 2021
  (x2) 2012, 2019
  (x1) 2017
South American Championship
  (x8) 2012, 2014, 2016, 2017, 2018, 2019, 2020, 2022
  (x1) 2015
  (x1) 2009
Brazilian Superliga
  (x6) 2011–12, 2013–14, 2014–15, 2015–16, 2016–17, 2017–18
  (x2) 2010–11, 2012–13
Brazilian Cup
 (x6) 2014, 2016, 2018, 2019, 2020, 2021
Brazilian Super Cup
 (x4) 2015, 2016, 2017, 2021
Minas Gerais State Championship
 (x13) 2008, 2010, 2011, 2012, 2013, 2014, 2015, 2016, 2017, 2018, 2019, 2020, 2021
  (x1) 2006

Kit providers
The table below shows the history of kit providers for Sada volleyball team.

Sponsorship
Primary sponsors include: main sponsors like Sada Transporte, other sponsors: Mitsubishi Motors, Molten Corporation, Amil Participacoes SA and Mater Dei.

References

External links
 

Volleyball clubs established in 2006
2006 establishments in Brazil
Volleyball clubs in Minas Gerais (state)
Brazilian volleyball clubs